Bexley Hospital, Bexleyheath was a cottage hospital on Upton Road in  Bexleyheath, founded in 1884 and  paid for by the Bexley United Charities. It was previously called the Bexley Cottage Hospital and Provident Dispensar. and the Bexley Cottage Hospital.

It was an acute hospital, and it ceased operating as a hospital in 1978. It is now known as the Upton Day Hospital, and is run by Oxleas NHS Foundation Trust.

References

Hospital buildings completed in 1884
NHS hospitals in London
Defunct hospitals in London